Boris Stavrev (7 March 1935 – 16 May 2003) was a Bulgarian foil and sabre fencer. He competed at the 1960 and 1972 Summer Olympics.

References

1935 births
2003 deaths
Bulgarian male foil fencers
Olympic fencers of Bulgaria
Fencers at the 1960 Summer Olympics
Fencers at the 1972 Summer Olympics
Sportspeople from Sofia
Bulgarian male sabre fencers